Deuterocopus issikii is a moth of the family Pterophoridae. It is known from New Guinea.

The length of the forewings is about 5.5 mm.

References

External links
Papua Insects

Deuterocopinae